Murphy Rocks is a rock outcrops 12 nautical miles (22 km) southeast of Mount West on the broad ice-covered ridge between the Hammond and Boyd Glaciers, in the Ford Ranges of Marie Byrd Land. Mapped by United States Antarctic Service (USAS) (1939–41) and by United States Geological Survey (USGS) from surveys and U.S. Navy air photos (1959–65). Named by Advisory Committee on Antarctic Names (US-ACAN) for Dion M. Murphy, aviation machinist's mate, U.S. Navy, a helicopter flight crewman during Operation Deep Freeze 1968.

See also
See also Murphy Rocks, Australian Antarctic Territory

References

 

Rock formations of Marie Byrd Land